Aimie is a feminine given name. Notable people with the name include:

 Aimie Clydesdale (born 1993), Australian basketball player
 Aimie Atkinson (born 1987), English actress and singer
 Aimie K. Runyan (born 1979), American author of historical and women's fiction, including bestsellers Daughters of the Night Sky and Across the Winding River

See also
 Aimée
 Aimi (disambiguation)

Feminine given names